Jumla: A Nurse's Story (Original title: Khalangama Hamala) is a 2013 Nepali war memoir by Radha Paudel. Paudel worked as health worker written during the Maoist insurgency in Jumla district in mid-western region of Nepal. It was published on May 23, 2013, by Nepa~laya publication. It won the Madan Puraskar which is the most recognized literary award in Nepal.

Synopsis 
Radha Poudel left her government job as a nurse in Chitwan and went to Jumla for a safe maternity program. While analyzing the social and health problems of Karnali, she herself became the victim of armed conflict on the night of the attack on the Maoist headquarters. The program was over but her stay in Jumla did not. She continued social activism in the region. She has been awarded the 'Women Peacemaker 2012' by the University of San Diego and the 'N-Peace Award 2012' by the United Nations Development Program (UNDP).

Reception 
The book won the Madan Puraskar for the year 2013.

Translations 
The book was translated into English as Jumla: A Nurse's Story jointly by Dev Paudel and Ishan Gurung.

See also 

 Antarmanko Yatra
 Singha Durbarko Ghumne Mech
 Palpasa Café
 Chhapamar ko Chhoro

References

Books about Nepal
Madan Puraskar-winning works
Works about the Nepalese Civil War
Nepalese books
Nepalese memoirs